Francisco Diaz-Pizarro is a Spanish professional pool player. Diaz-Pizarro is a two time European champion winning the 9-Ball event in 2013 and 2015.  In 2015, he also received a runners-up medal in the 10-Ball event, losing in the final to Greece's Alexander Kazakis.

Diaz is also a mainstay competitor of the Euro Tour, reaching the semi-final of four events, including the 2018 Dynamic Billiard Treviso Open.

Achievements
 2012 European Pool Championship 9-Ball
 2012 Spanish Pool Championship 9-Ball
 2012 European Pool Championship 9-Ball

References

External links

Spanish pool players
1977 births
Living people
Place of birth missing (living people)